Offlow is a hundred in the county of Staffordshire, England,  located in the south-east of that county. It is named after a tumulus or mound in the parish of Swinfen and Packington,  2½ miles south of Lichfield. The hundred is recorded in the Domesday Book under the name "Offelav".

Derivation of name

The name of the hundred derives from Old English Offa, a personal name and hlaw meaning 'hill' or 'mound'. A  large  number  of  Hundred names refer to hills or mounds. Some of these at least are very conspicuous hills, which afford a commanding view of the countryside for miles around. It seems likely that such sites were chosen as hundred meeting places being remote and where interference was most easily avoided. In the case of Offlow, it is  a small hill rising to 367 ft. (112 metres), centrally placed in the hundred. The hill is now used for a radio mast., rather than a hundred meeting place.

History
The origin of the hundred dates from the division of his kingdom by King Alfred the Great into counties, hundreds and tithings. From the beginning, Staffordshire was divided into the hundreds of Offlow, Pirehill, Totmonslow, Cuttleston and Seisdon.

Lichfield left the jurisdiction of Staffordshire, and Offlow Hundred, when the city was created a county separate from Staffordshire by a charter granted by Mary I of England in 1553, which came into effect with the election of its own Sheriff in December that year.

In the 19th century Offlow was the largest in population of the five hundreds of Staffordshire, with a population in 1871 of 250,790 excluding parliamentary boroughs or    299,588 including them, representing 35% of the county.

The importance of the hundreds declined from the 17th century, and most of their functions were extinguished with the establishment of county courts in 1867. In 1894 the Hundred was made obsolete with the establishment of Urban Districts and Rural Districts in Staffordshire.

Divisions
The hundred was divided into two divisions Offlow North and Offlow South. The area of Offlow North was 75,080 acres and the area of Offlow South was 95,640 acres.

According to the archives in the Staffordshire Record Office, the subdivision of the hundred dates back to the 17th century.

When the Stafford county parliamentary constituency was divided into a North Division and a South Division by the Reform Act 1832, Offlow North and South were allocated to the North and South county divisions respectively.

In 1839 the Staffordshire magistrates decided to adopt the  County Police Act of 1839 for the southern division of Offlow South.

Geography
Offlow contained following local government units:

Offlow North

Offlow South

Statfold, although classed in Offlow South, was separated from it by intervening parts of the Offlow North.

In all, the Hundred comprised 38 parishes and 7 extra parochial places, containing within them around a hundred townships and hamlets (some being chapelries). For example, Swinfen and Packington were hamlets of the ancient parish of Weeford. In addition to the above, Offlow included 4 townships belonging Wolverhampton Parish and several hamlets and townships belonging to the Lichfield parishes of St. Mary and St.Chad, outside the bounds of the  City and County of Lichfield. 

Offlow Hundred consists of south-east Staffordshire extending from the River Dove to the environs of Birmingham and Wolverhampton. The north is more agricultural  while the south has the manufacturing districts, with Walsall, Wednesbury and West Bromwich.

Its length from north to south is about 30 miles, and its average breadth from eight to twelve miles. From north to south these are Totmonslow, Pirehill, Cuttleston and Seisdon. 
 
It has extensive plains, broken only by gentle undulations, except on its southern and western borders, where some of the hills rise rather abruptly. 
The lowlands in the valleys of the Trent, Tame, and Dove have been frequently inundated by these rivers, to form rich pastures, celebrated for cattle, and the production of cheese.

The market towns within the hundred are Burton-upon-Trent (Burton-on-Trent parish had three other townships in Derbyshire), Tamworth(Tamworth borough was partly in Warwickshire, in which county it had 4 townships), Walsall, Wednesbury, and Lichfield, but the latter formed a county of itself, though locally situated in the centre of Offlow.

Hundred Court
The Hundred Court of Offlow was a hundred court at common law, rather than one bestowed with powers by a special statute. It had the same jurisdiction and process as the county court except that the defendant had to reside in the hundred. Most of these common law hundred courts had grown much out of use by the 19th century, but the court was still fully active in the Hundred of Offlow. However, the Hundred Court of Offlow was abolished in 1852 and its functions transferred to the county court.

The court was held in Walsall, before a steward appointed by the High Sheriff of Staffordshire, at the old Town Hall building.

Current local government
The current local government arrangements in Staffordshire were created in 1974 under the Local Government Act 1972.
Offlow Hundred comprises the present districts of Lichfield (except for the parish of Colton and the inner part of the city of Lichfield that was formerly a separate county), Tamworth (Staffordshire part), Sandwell and Walsall. Also the eastern half of East Staffordshire including the town of Burton on Trent.

Notes

Hundreds of Staffordshire